Kanya Mahavidyalaya, established in 1977, is a general degree women's college situated in Guwahati, Assam. This college is affiliated with the Gauhati University. This college offers different bachelor's degree courses in arts.

References

External links
http://www.kanyamahavidyalaya.org/index.php

Universities and colleges in Guwahati
Colleges affiliated to Gauhati University
Educational institutions established in 1977
1977 establishments in Assam